Redmond Bluff is an abrupt east-facing bluff (1,200 m) standing 2.5 nautical miles (4.6 km) east of Mount Dalmeny in the Anare Mountains. Mapped by United States Geological Survey (USGS) from surveys and U.S. Navy aerial photography, 1960–63. Named by Advisory Committee on Antarctic Names (US-ACAN) for James R. Redmond, United States Antarctic Research Program (USARP) biologist at McMurdo Station, 1967–68.
 

Cliffs of Victoria Land
Pennell Coast